Nabeela Syed is an American politician and Democratic member of the Illinois House of Representatives from the 51st district. The 51st district, located in Chicago's north suburbs, includes all or parts of Hawthorn Woods, Long Grove, Lake Zurich, Deer Park, Kildeer, Palatine, Rolling Meadows, Hoffman Estates, and Schaumburg.

Early life 
Syed was born and raised in Illinois. Her parents immigrated to Palatine from Hyderabad, India during the 1980s. Syed graduated from high school in Palatine. She is Muslim. She completed a bachelor's degree in political science from the University of California, Berkeley.

Syed said she was inspired to become involved in politics in 2016 -- when she was a senior in high school -- by the anti-immigrant and anti-Muslim sentiment in the country at the time, associated with Donald Trump.

Political career 
In 2021, Syed served as Campaign Manager for Township High School District 211 School Board Member Tim McGowan. According to her LinkedIn profile, she served as a Marketing and Development intern at EMILY'S List.

Syed works for the non-profit CivicNation as an Assistant Director of Digital Strategy.

Illinois House of Representatives 
Syed ran for state representative for the 51st District in 2022, against incumbent Republican Chris Bos.

Syed said she ran for the House at the urging of her friend. In one of the tightest and closest-watched General Assembly races that year, Syed focused her campaign on abortion access, healthcare affordability, and property tax reform. Bos opposed abortion rights. Syed out-raised Bos nine to one.

Syed defeated Bos with 22,775 votes (53.28%) to the incumbent's 20,847 votes (46.72%).

Tenure 
She took office on January 11, 2023. At 23, Syed is one of the youngest people and one of the only Muslims to ever serve in the General Assembly.

Electoral history

2022 
In 2022, Syed won the Democratic nomination and incumbent Chris Bos won the Republican nomination for the 51st district. In the general election, Syed defeated Bos with 22,775 votes (53.28%) to the incumbent's 20,847 votes (46.72%).

References

External links

Living people
Year of birth missing (living people)
Place of birth missing (living people)
People from Palatine, Illinois
21st-century American women politicians
Illinois Democrats
Women state legislators in Illinois
Asian-American state legislators in Illinois
American politicians of Indian descent
American Muslims
University of California, Berkeley alumni
Politicians from Cook County, Illinois
21st-century American politicians